"I'm Glad" is a song by American singer and actress Jennifer Lopez for her third studio album, This Is Me... Then (2002). It was written by Lopez, Troy Oliver, Cory Rooney, Mr. Deyo and Jesse Weaver Jr. and produced by Oliver and Rooney. It was released as the album's third single on April 7, 2003.

Background and composition
Lopez's third studio album This Is Me... Then was released in November 2002. It featured the entertainer in a more "hands-on role" than ever before, writing more material. Her fiancé at the time, actor Ben Affleck, was her muse and inspiration for the album's lyrics; the title referred to "who you are at the time", and it was something Lopez wanted to look back on in the future. Affleck and Lopez became a prominent supercouple in popular culture, referred to as "Bennifer" by the public. "Jenny from the Block" was released as the album's lead single, peaking at number three on the US Billboard Hot 100, while its second single "All I Have", topped the Hot 100. However, Lopez was initially dissatisfied with the release of both singles. She felt that the tracks were too similar to her previous singles such as "Ain't It Funny" and "I'm Real"; she felt like she was "visiting old territory". She subsequently released "I'm Glad" as the album's third single, with it being serviced to Top 40 radio and Rhythmic radio on April 7, 2003. The song was issued in the United Kingdom on June 9, 2003, across three formats: a CD single, and DVD single, and a cassette single. In Australia, a CD single was distributed on June 23, 2003.

"I'm Glad" is an uptempo R&B ballad which runs for a duration of three minutes and forty-two seconds. Lopez wrote the song with the assistance of Troy Oliver, Cory Rooney, Andre Deyo and Schooly D, with Oliver and Rooney serving as producers. She recorded her vocals for the track with Peter Wade Keusch and Bruce Swedien at The Hit Factory recording studios in New York City, where it was also mixed. "I'm Glad" contains a sample of the 1986 Schooly D song "P.S.K. What Does It Mean?". Its instrumentation consists of classical harp runs laced throughout a computer-generated beat. Written in the key of Db Major, Lopez's vocal spans from an A3 to a C5. Its instrumentation includes the use of piano and guitar. "I'm Glad" is about finding true love, containing lyrics such as "I think I'm in love. Damn, finally". The Boston Globe noted the song's lyrics to be about her relationship with actor Ben Affleck, who served as Lopez's muse for This Is Me... Then.

Reception
Steven Morse of The Boston Globe praised the song, describing it as "elegantly" structured. The song was nominated for "Choice Love Song" at the 2003 Teen Choice Awards. "I'm Glad" entered the US Billboard Hot 100 at number 64, on the issue date May 3, 2003. In its fourth week on the chart, the song climbed to its peak position of number 32, making it her lowest-charting single since "Feelin' So Good" (2000). However, it was more successful on the Billboard Hot Dance Club Songs chart, peaking at number four on the issue date July 12, 2003. The song made its peak at 11 in the UK Official Charts Company for 14 good weeks.  "I'm Glad" debuted and peaked at number eight in Canada, becoming her eighth top-ten hit. It also entered the Australian Singles Chart at number ten, its peak position, and was later certified gold by the Australian Recording Industry Association.

Music video

Development and synopsis
The music video for "I'm Glad" was filmed in February 2003. When coming up with ideas for the video, Lopez's only goal was to dance by herself without the help of any other people. She hired David LaChapelle to direct, and he then came up with the idea to recreate the film Flashdance (1983). LaChapelle identically fashioned the "sets, iconography, and costuming" of Flashdance as a back-drop for Lopez to dance. For the music video, Lopez sported her natural curly hair, leotards and "tiny pants". She spent several hours at night perfecting the music video, taking part in the editing process herself.

During the music video's editing stages, Lopez wanted to make sure everything was authentic. She said, "I really worked out and did the diet thing... and then after the video...there's always that one guy who's like 'We should retouch this'. I was like, 'You're going to leave everything the way it is. That's how it wiggles and jiggles in real life, that's how they're going to see it in the video. And I noticed—[the editors] sent [the video] to me and they have shaved off a little bit of my hips and—I was like, 'That ain't me—those are not my hips. Just leave them the way they are. Do me a favor—don't touch my hips. Don't try to make me look skinnier. It's fine, it's fine the way it is'. And that's what they did." Prior to the clip being released, Jon Wiederhorn of MTV News reported that it was heavily influenced by the 1980s, stating that Lopez "strikes '80s dance moves, and the color, style and camerawork have a decidedly retro vibe".

Identical to the storyline in Flashdance, Lopez plays a young aspiring dancer who welds by day and dances by night at a bar. The clip begins with Lopez entering a dance studio wearing a puffy jacket and scarf. She has arrived at an audition, with a table of judges present. Suddenly, the screen switches to showing different aspects of her life, including her at her modest home, riding through the neighborhood on a bike with her dog running along, as well as her role as an exotic dancer at a local bar and grill. Later, at a strip club, she is seen dancing to intricate choreography clothed in a skimpy red top. She then appears exercising and practicing her dance moves in another location. The screen then switches to before she entered the dance audition; she walks through a line of intimidating beautiful ballerinas. Lopez's dance routine in front of the judges then commences her audition, which includes her dancing on the judge's table, as they move their feet to the music.

Reception
A writer from The New York Times praised the video, stating that Lopez "has taken what's thrilling about the movie - the idea of a working-class girls who makes her mark on the world - and presented it as a buffed-up fairy-tale version of her own career", calling Lopez a "pleasure to watch". About.com's Jason Shawhan considered it her second best video, behind "Waiting for Tonight", and called it one of her most "interesting efforts", describing the dance work on display as "punishing". Writing for the UGO Networks, K. Thor Jensen placed the video seventeenth on a list of the "50 Sexiest Music Videos of All Time", calling it a "funky" homage to Flashdance that "J-Lo in several scenes from the classic flick, dancing like her life depended on it". Jensen also wrote, "The video would earn a spot on this list just for the bit where water pours down from the ceiling on Lopez, but luckily the rest of the clip keeps the quality high." Joe Usmar of the Daily Mirror regarded it as one of the "10 Sexiest Music Videos Ever Made", praising Lopez's physicality and calling its visuals "goddamn hawt". Mike Nied of Idolator ranked it as Lopez's second best music video, writing: "It is hard to imagine a pop star in 2018 pulling off the choreography to Flashdance quite as flawlessly as J.Lo does here."

Author Daniel Bernardi noted that "While Beal's performance was criticized for its lack of dance, Lopez's bodily performance faced scrutiny for its excess." In the book Dance and the Hollywood Latina: Race, Sex, and Stardom (2011), author Priscilla Peña Ovalle observed that the music video's provocative sexual choreography "authenticated [Lopez] as a bona fide Hollywood Latina by showing her dancing in shots that tilt from face to fanny". Ovalle also wrote that the storyline of Flashdance was similar to Lopez's life, and she fully embodied a "fantasy of achievement". Similarly, Gary Susman of Time wrote: "In a way, of course, Lopez was re-enacting her own life story, that of the Bronx girl who’d used street moves to dance her way to fame. Unlike Flashdance, 'I’m Glad' starred a woman who could perform her own dance moves." The video was nominated for four MTV Video Music Awards, including Best Female Video, Best Dance Video, Best Choreography in a Video and Best Art Direction in a Video.

Lawsuits
The recreation of dance sequences from Flashdance led the film's production company, Paramount Pictures, to sue Lopez and Sony Music over copyright infringement claims. A spokesperson for Lopez said that the film is one of Lopez's favorite movies, and that clip was nothing but a tribute to it. Paramount and Sony settled out of court. Apart from this, Maureen Marder—whose life was the inspiration for Flashdance—sued Lopez and Sony for copyright infringement in November 2003. Additionally, Marder had previously also sued Paramount for only paying her a $2,300 fee for her story, which the film adaption of grossed over $150 million at the United States box office. Marder "had refused to grant sequel rights or to permit any further use of her story or identity after the film became a success" according to her attorney, Robert Hefling. Hefling stated, "She is penniless, disabled with a spinal injury, and trying to raise a teenage daughter. Now her life story is on the screen again—and other people are profiting from it—with no acknowledgment of her rights, let alone fair compensation for her contribution." In June 2006, all of Marder's claims were dismissed.

Live performances

During the song's initial release Lopez did not perform the song live at any moment in time until her acceptance at the MTV Video Music Awards in 2018 where she performed a small section of the song in her 10 minute long medley including recreating the video moment in which a bucket of water is splashed onto her from above while dancing (a hologram light replacing the water during the performance). Lopez included I’m Glad in her set list for the 2021 Global Citizen Live Festival.

Track listing

US CD single
"I'm Glad" (album version) – 3:42
"I'm Glad" (Paul Oakenfold's perfecto remix) – 5:46

US 12" single
"I'm Glad" (Paul Oakenfold perfecto remix) – 5:46
"I'm Glad" (J-Lo vs. Who Da Funk main mix) – 7:21
"I'm Glad" (Ford's Siren club mix) – 5:28
"I'm Glad" (Murk Miami mix) – 8:00

US DVD single
"I'm Glad" (video)
"All I Have" (featuring LL Cool J; video)

UK CD single (The Club Remixes)
"I'm Glad" (album version) – 3:42
"I'm Glad" (Ford's Siren club mix radio edit) – 3:23
"I'm Glad" (Murk Miami mix radio edit) – 3:39
"I'm Glad" (J-Lo vs. Who Da Funk main mix) – 7:21

UK cassette single
"I'm Glad" (album version) – 3:42
"I'm Glad" (Big Brovaz remix) – 3:42
"I'm Glad" (album version) – 3:42
"I'm Glad" (Big Brovaz remix) – 3:42

UK DVD single
"I'm Glad" (extended video version)
"I'm Glad" (Big Brovaz remix) – 3:42
"I'm Glad" (Paul Oakenfold perfecto remix) – 5:46
"2 Minutes of Edited Footage from Behind the Scenes" (video)

Charts

Weekly charts

Year-end charts

Certifications

Release history

References

Bibliography

External links
 

2002 songs
2003 singles
Epic Records singles
Jennifer Lopez songs
Music video controversies
Music videos directed by David LaChapelle
Songs written by Cory Rooney
Songs written by Jennifer Lopez
Songs written by Troy Oliver
Song recordings produced by Cory Rooney
Songs written by Andre Deyo
Song recordings produced by Troy Oliver